Clovis North High School is a combination junior high school (grades 7 and 8) and high school (grades 9-12) sharing a common administration, campus, and teaching staff. It is located on the corner of Willow & International in Fresno, California, across the street from Clovis Community College Center.  It is composed of Clovis North High School and Granite Ridge Intermediate.

Clovis North is ranked 133rd within California. Students have the opportunity to take Advanced Placement course work and exams. The AP participation rate at Clovis North is 61 percent. Clovis North is ranked #835 in the National Rankings and earned a silver medal. Schools are ranked based on their performance on state-required tests and how well they prepare students for college. In 2007, Clovis North Educational Center was established as Clovis Unified School District's fifth high school, and fifth junior high school.

Academics
Clovis North offers nineteen AP classes as well as six honors classes, two comprehensive four-year foreign language programs, and a variety of performing and visual arts classes including drama, photography, ceramics, art, videography, choir, orchestra, color guard, and band among others. Additionally, students have the option of, as a Junior or Senior, taking vocationally-oriented courses through the Regional Occupational Training program or CART high school. Clovis North and Granite Ridge have the highest API based on state testing in the entirety of Clovis Unified School District.

Honors Classes:
Honors Biology
Honors Chemistry
Honors English 9
Honors English 10
Honors Algebra 2
Honors Advanced Math and Analysis

AP Classes:
AP Environmental Science
AP Biology
AP Chemistry
AP Physics C
AP Physics 1
AP Computer Science Principles
AP Computer Science A
AP English Language and Composition
AP English Language and Literature
AP Human Geography
AP World History
AP United States History
AP United States Government
AP Macroeconomics
AP Microeconomics
AP Psychology
AP Calculus AB
AP Calculus BC
AP Statistics
AP Spanish
AP French

Honors societies and awards
Clovis North Educational Center gives out multiple awards each year and its students are part of multiple honors societies. The school gives out awards for Athlete of the Year for both boys and girls sports. It also bestows the title of Academic Scholar of Distinction if a student takes at least five AP classes and passes two AP exams by the end of his or her junior year. Additionally, a student can become a member of the National Honor Society if selected by a committee of teachers, counselors, and administrators on campus. Honor Roll, High Honor Roll, and Principal's Honor Roll is based on a student's unweighted GPA each semester. Sophomores are nominated each year to become members of the National Society of High School Scholars. A student is designated a valedictorian if they received no B's throughout their first seven semesters. The students with the top 20 GPA's are also recognized at the graduation ceremony and in the yearbook.

The Mock Trial team won three straight county championships between 2010-2012 in addition to placing 3rd and 4th at the state competitions. They triumphed again in the 2016 county competition to make it to the state competition.

The Science Olympiad team has competed at the state championship multiple years in a row. The Forensics team won valley championships in 2011 and 2013.

The FIRST Robotics Competition team, after winning the Davis regional competition, traveled to the FIRST Championship in 2010. Academic Decathlon won their first Division III Championship in 2013.

Athletics
Clovis North High School won back-to-back CIF Central Section championships in football during the 2011 (D-II) and 2012 seasons and lost the championship in 2013. The team received a state bowl bid after the 2012 championship but lost 28-7 against Long Beach Polytechnic High School in the semi-final. The varsity athletics teams were promoted to CIF Division I for the 2012-13 athletics year. Villyan Bijev, an alum of the school, was signed by Liverpool FC of the Premier League after his senior year.

The varsity baseball team won its first section championship in the 2013 season and was ranked in the top 20 in the nation entering the 2014 season. The varsity boys soccer team, coached by former USA Olympic Soccer Team captain Chad McCarty, won a Division II section championship in the 2011-12 season.

In 2013, the Granite Ridge Intermediate School football team was undefeated. In 2014 and 2015 the Granite Ridge junior varsity basketball team was undefeated also. In 2016, the Clovis North boys golf team clinched its first Tri-River Athletic Conference championship by defeating former champion Clovis West. Clovis North boys tennis also upset defending tennis champion Clovis West in 2016 to claim their first D-I tennis title.

Varsity Athletics

Boys

Fall: Football, Water Polo, Cross Country
Winter: Soccer, Basketball, Wrestling
Spring: Baseball, Tennis, Swimming and Diving, Track and Field, Volleyball, Golf

Girls

Fall: Gymnastics, Water Polo, Tennis, Cross Country, Volleyball, Golf
Winter: Soccer, Basketball
Spring: Badminton, Track and Field, Softball, Swimming and Diving

Performing Arts
The Clovis North Educational Music Department consists of a variety of performing experiences for students at all grade and ability levels including: an award winning Marching Band, two high school Concert Bands at the beginning and advanced levels, a high school String Ensemble, Symphony Orchestra that includes students in grades 7 - 12, two Jazz Ensembles at the beginning and advanced levels, three middle school Concert Bands at the beginning, intermediate, and advanced levels, three middle school String Ensembles, Winter Percussion Ensembles, Winter Color Guard, Chamber Ensembles, and award winning Choir Ensembles.

Notable acheviements of the band and color guard program at Clovis North include: Western Band Association (WBA) 2013 1A/2A/3A Class Grand Champions, a featured performing ensemble at the 2016 Music For All National Concert band Festival, selection for the 2017 Midwest Clinic.

Within the choir program notable achievements include: Clovis North Chamber Choir and the Women's Chorale have been invited to sing many times in the Fresno State Command Performance concert and the Women's Chorale placed third in a California Choral Invitational in 2011. Chamber and Chorale were both accepted to the 15th Annual New York Choral Festival in 2015. The festival accepts both high school and college choirs, but only five choirs total - two of those five from Clovis North. The other three choirs were from Germany, Estonia, and Montclair State University. The choirs performed in Carnegie Hall and St. Paul the Apostle Church in New York.

References

High schools in Fresno, California
Public high schools in California
Education in Fresno County, California